Yugoryonok is a disused airport in Russia located  north of Yugoryonok, a former gold mining town. With the cessation of most of the gold mining activity in the area in the 1990s, the airport was closed.

Its concrete runway appears to be in decay. Its  runway length is a common indicator of Soviet Air Force installations built during the 1950s, so it probably had some military use. For geography, see Yudoma River.

References
RussianAirFields.com

Soviet Air Force bases
Airports built in the Soviet Union
Airports in the Sakha Republic